Clarke's vole (Microtus clarkei) is a species of rodent in the family Cricetidae.
It is found only in China.

References

 Baillie, J. 1996.  Volemys clarkei.   2006 IUCN Red List of Threatened Species.   Downloaded on 20 July 2007.

Microtus
Rodents of China
Mammals described in 1923
Taxa named by Martin Hinton
Taxonomy articles created by Polbot